The Hipaua steaming cliffs are a geological feature on the southern shores of Lake Taupō near Little Waihi, which also has hot springs associated with the Hipaua geothermal area.

Geology

Geothermal

The scarp is somewhat eroded and much of the steaming cliffs area is a slope of about 30 degrees covered by native bush. The largest Hipaua fumarole (Hipaua means 'the chimney') discharges at 1.4 MW and the whole geothermal area extending with hot water discharges from Little Waihi to Tokaanu Domain on the shore of the Lake itself discharges at 21MW.

Faults
The active intra-rift Waihi Fault Zone extends at least 38km from Little Waihi at Lake Taupō towards Mount Ruapehu. It has the potential to be associated with 6.5 magnitude  earthquakes with recurrence intervals between 490 and 1,380 years. It may well extend in a fault complex another  on land or even beyond the shore line of Lake Taupo.

Landslides
Large landslides occurred on 7 May 1846 (60 dead) and 20 March 1910 (one died) adjacent to the steaming cliffs area. Maori oral tradition reported 140 died in a third slip before European contact. These landslide events have been reported to be associated with earthquakes, the potential for hydrothermal eruptions and rain and all might play roles separately or together at various times. There is evidence of at least seven such events. Since the last period of active activity on the fault scarp in 2009 which resulted in the temporary evacuation of Little Waihi, monitoring for slippage has been intensified.

References

Lake Taupō
Geothermal areas in New Zealand
Landslides in New Zealand
Taupō Volcanic Zone